Sylvie Cantin (born 15 March 1970) is a Canadian speed skater. She competed in the women's 1000 metres at the 1998 Winter Olympics.

References

External links
 

1970 births
Living people
Canadian female speed skaters
Olympic speed skaters of Canada
Speed skaters at the 1998 Winter Olympics
Speed skaters from Quebec City
20th-century Canadian women